Neolepisorus fortunei  (Fortune's ribbon fern), is a species of fern native to southern China south to Malaysia, found by streams in forests.

References

Polypodiaceae